Sauchay is a commune in the Seine-Maritime department in the Normandy region in northern France.

Geography

Population

Places of interest
 A château and its gardens.
 The church of Notre-Dame, dating from the sixteenth century.
 The church of St. Martial at Sauchay-le-Bas, dating from the eleventh century.
 A sixteenth-century stone cross.

See also
Communes of the Seine-Maritime department

References

Communes of Seine-Maritime